Sve najbolje is a greatest hits compilation album of the Croatian band Thompson. It was released in 2003. This album was made out of 17 songs that showed their success in past 5 albums. There was
a new song 'Ivane Pavle II' (John Paul II) that was dedicated to visit of pope John Paul II to the Republic of Croatia.

Track listing
 "Ivane Pavle II" (John Paul II) (4:28)
 "Radost s visina" (Joy from Above) (4:58)
 "Lijepa li si [s gostima]" (You are Beautiful) (4:18)
 "Prijatelji" (Friends) (3:56)
 "E, moj narode" (Oh, my people) (4:56)
 "Reci, brate moj" (Tell me, my brother) (4:25)
 "Neću izdat ja" (I will not betray) (4:08)
 "Rosa" (Dew) (3:02)
 "Ljutu travu na ljutu ranu" (Sour grass on the sour wound) (4:18)
 "Ne varaj me" (Don't deceive me) (4:15)
 "Geni kameni [uživo]" (Genes of stone) (6:02)
 "Iza devet sela" (Behind nine towns) (4:00)
 "Moj Ivane" (My Ivan) (3:33)
 "Zaustavi se vjetre" (Stop, wind) (4:19)
 "Pukni puško" (Gun, shoot) (3:36)
 "Bojna Čavoglave" (Čavoglave Battalion) (3:23)
 "Anica - kninska kraljica" (Anica - the queen of Knin) (3:52)
 "Stari se" (Getting older) (3:45)

Sve najbolje
2004 compilation albums
Croatia Records compilation albums